Stade des Minimes is a rugby league stadium in Toulouse, France. It is the home ground of Toulouse Olympique Broncos.

History 

Stade des Minimes or as it is also known Stade Arnauné has been the home of Toulouse Olympique since their founding in 1937. The town council agreed to purchase the ground for the sole use of the new sport, rugby league. When the river Garonne burst its banks in 1965 a test match between France and New Zealand scheduled for the Stade Municipal in Toulouse was cancelled because of flooding, the game was moved across town to the Stade des Minimes the first international game played at the ground. The same thing happened in 1999 when a round of matches in the Mediterranean Cup was moved when Lézignan's Stade du Moulin was also waterlogged. In 2015 when Toulouse Olympique moved to the British rugby league system to play in League 1 Toulouse Olympique moved to the Stade Ernest-Argeles. Toulouse Olympique Broncos who play in the Elite One Championship in France remained at the ground. Currently it has a capacity of 4066, including (2,000 seats). It is due to be expanded to reach a 10,000 capacity over the next two years. The renovation plans include the extending of the two main stands, the creation of a shop, a gym, and an administrative office for the club. The cost of the project is estimated to be 8 million euros.

Rugby League Internationals

External links
Map of the stadium location
How to get there

References

 

Rugby league stadiums in France
Sports venues in Toulouse
Toulouse Olympique
Sports venues completed in 1937